Dan BaDarom is an Israeli bus company, which provides bus routes in the Northern Negev. The company is a subsidiary of Dan Bus Company.

In 2015, Dan Bus Company established the subsidiary Dan BaDarom to compete on tenders to operate bus routes in southern Israel.

In May 2015, Dan BaDarom won a tender to operate bus routes in the Northern Negev, Ashkelon, Kiryat Malakhi, Kiryat Gat, Sderot, Netivot and Ofakim. The tender contained Egged Ta'avura's routes in the area and some new routes. In January 2016, Dan BaDarom won the tender of the urban bus routes in Be'er Sheva. These routes will be operated under a new subsidiary called "Dan Beersheva".

On February 12, 2016, Dan BaDarom started to operate the bus routes in the Northern Negev except the intracity service in Ashkelon.
The operation starting date of the intracity service in Ashkelon was delayed from May 2016 to July 2016 because of bad service in Northern Negev routes. On July 1, 2016, Dan BaDarom started to operate the intracity service in Ashkelon.

External links
Official Website
Transportation Services

Bus companies of Israel